Kasbah Boulaouane is a kasbah in the town of Boulaouane, Morocco. It is situated on the rock which sits at the curve of Oum Er-Rbia River, overlooking the surrounding area. In the 20th century, an orientalist Edmond Doutté had provided a detailed description for the kasbah.

History
Kasbah Boulaouane was commissioned around 1710. It is considered among tens of other kasbahs built during the era of the Alaouite sultan Ismail Ibn Sharif as a local center for administration. The kasbah is placed on the strategic location which overlooks the river, and reachable through the strategic corridor known as Al-Kurrasa. The building is modeled after the similar fortification built during the Byzantine-era. There had been a long tradition among the Maghrebi dynasties such Almoravid, Almohad, Marinid and Saadi to construct kasbahs as fortifications, and this is considered another addition by the Alaouite Sultan.

The kasbah was abandoned later, and covered by the sand. The accumulation of sand reached the same height as the kasbah wall, and it took intensive removal of the sand to restore some of the facilities such as mosque inside the kasbah. The restoration has been conducted along with the overhauling of the surrounding area into a tourist spot, by arranging the infrastructure.

References

18th-century establishments in Morocco
Kasbahs in Morocco
18th-century architecture in Morocco

'Alawi architecture